Maurice D'Haese (7 November 1919, in Lede – 27 April 1981, in Aalst) was a Flemish writer who was awarded the 1953 Ark Prize of the Free Word.

Bibliography
 De heilige gramschap (1952) 
 De witte muur (1957) 
 Verhalen (1961)

Awards
 1953 - Arkprijs van het Vrije Woord
 Dirk Martensprijs

See also
 Flemish literature

References
 Maurice D'Haese
 G.J. van Bork en P.J. Verkruijsse, De Nederlandse en Vlaamse auteurs (1985)

1919 births
1981 deaths
D'Haese, Maurice
Ark Prize of the Free Word winners